The 2017 Chooks-To-Go PSL Grand Prix Conference was the fourth conference and third indoor tournament for the Philippine Super Liga's fifth season. The games began on October 21, 2017 with the formal opening ceremony on October 28, 2017 at the Filoil Flying V Centre, San Juan.

Teams

Preliminary round

|}

|}

Playoffs

Quarterfinals

|}

Semifinals

|}

Bronze match

|}

Finals

|}

Final standing

Individual awards

Venues
Filoil Flying V Center (main venue)
University of St. La Salle–Bacolod
Malolos Sports and Convention Center
De La Salle Lipa Centrum
Batangas City Sports Center
Mall of Asia Arena

Broadcast partners
Sports5: AksyonTV, ESPN 5, Hyper (SD and HD), Sports5.ph

References

All-Filipino
PSL